When She Was Good is a 1967 novel by Philip Roth. It is Roth's only novel with a female protagonist.

Summary  
Set in a small town in the American Midwest during the 1940s, the novel portrays a moralistic young woman, Lucy Nelson.

Plot 
When still a child, Lucy Nelson had her alcoholic father thrown in jail. Ever since then, she has been trying to reform the men around her, even if that ultimately means destroying herself in the process.

Reception 
In the New York Times, critic and writer Wilfrid Sheed observed Roth remains a comic novelist: “His best scenes are still his lightest, the ones you aren't looking for.” Sheed continued, “At the same time, it should be emphasized that ‘When She Was Good,’ both in its sustained theme and its detail work, is a step in class above most recent novels: up on the ledge, in fact, where stringent standards set in. Roth is a serious writer, willing to turn his face against fashion and the expected. . . Roth is one of our few important writers concerning whose future it is possible to feel anything like real curiosity.”

References 

1967 American novels
Novels by Philip Roth
Novels republished in the Library of America
Novels set in the 1940s
Random House books